"Full Focus" is an instrumental composition by Dutch disc jockey and producer Armin van Buuren. It was released on 24 June 2010 in the Netherlands as the first single from van Buuren's fourth studio album, Mirage.

Music video 
The music video was released to Armada Music's YouTube channel on 23 June 2010. It is a live recording from A State of Trance 450 festival.

Track listing 
Digital download
 "Full Focus" – 4:22

Digital download / 12" 
 "Full Focus"  – 6:49
 "Full Focus"  – 7:03
 "Full Focus"  – 7:42
 "Full Focus"  – 7:09

CD 
 "Full Focus"  – 2:46
 "Full Focus"  – 6:49
 "Full Focus"  – 7:03
 "Full Focus"  – 7:42
 "Full Focus"  – 7:09

Charts

References 

2010 songs
2010 singles
Armin van Buuren songs
Songs written by Armin van Buuren
Armada Music singles
Songs written by Benno de Goeij